Ebrahim Saide (born 6 December 1951) is an Ethiopian boxer. He competed in the men's light welterweight event at the 1980 Summer Olympics.

References

1951 births
Living people
Ethiopian male boxers
Olympic boxers of Ethiopia
Boxers at the 1980 Summer Olympics
Place of birth missing (living people)
Light-welterweight boxers